Johnny Rogers is a Spanish-American former basketball player.

Johnny Rogers or Rodgers may also refer to:
Johnny Rogers (rugby) (1892–1958), Welsh rugby union and rugby league footballer
Johnny Rodgers (born 1951), American football player
Johnny Rodgers (singer) (born 1974), American singer-songwriter and pianist

See also
John Rogers (disambiguation)
John Rodgers (disambiguation)